Loued Lakhdar is a small town and rural commune in El Kelâat Es-Sraghna Province of the Marrakesh-Safi region of Morocco. At the time of the 2004 census, the commune had a population of 9,362 living in 1,469 households.

References

Populated places in El Kelâat Es-Sraghna Province
Rural communes of Marrakesh-Safi